Deborah Hicks Quazzo is an American businesswoman. Since 2009, she has been the managing partner of GSV Advisors, a venture capital fund specializing in education and technology.

Background
Deborah Quazzo grew up in Jacksonville, FL. She graduated  a BA in history from Princeton University in 1982 and an MBA from Harvard University in 1987. She is married and has three children.

GSV Advisors
Quazzo is the founder and managing partner of the GSV Ventures, whose portfolio of companies includes Andela, ClassDojo, Course Hero, Coursera, CreativeLive, Degreed, HotChalk, Hustle, MasterClass, NoRedInk, Pluralsight, RaiseMe, Remind, Turnitin, Tynker, and Voxy. The firm also co-hosts, with Arizona State University, the annual ASU+GSV Summit. The event celebrates innovations and innovators across the global "preK to Gray" learning and talent landscape.

Career and civic engagement
In 2001, Quazzo co-founded ThinkEquity Partners, an investment bank with offices across the U.S., which was acquired in 2007 by London-based Panmure Gordon & Co. She was a member of the Panmure Gordon board until she resigned from the firm. Prior to that, she was a managing director in Investment Banking and head of the Global Growth Group at Merrill Lynch. She began her career at J.P. Morgan & Co.

Quazzo serves on the board of Ascend Learning, Degreed, The Educational Testing Service (ETS), Lightneer, Remind, and Web.com. She is a board observer at CreativeLive, and RaiseMe, and an advisory board member of Area9 Lyceum. She is a member of the boards of The Common Ground Foundation, Harvey Mudd College, National Louis University, Steppenwolf Theater Company, the Board of Dean's Advisors at Harvard Business School, the Khan Academy Thought Leadership Council, the Board of Dean's Advisory Council at Princeton University, the Strada Institute for the Future of Work Advisory Committee, and the Honorary Board of Marwen. She is a member of the Steering Committee of the Illinois Business Immigration Coalition.

Quazzo was previously a member of the Chicago Board of Education appointed by Mayor Rahm Emanuel until resigning in 2015.

Additionally, she has previously served on the boards of a number of education organizations including America's Promise, New Schools for Chicago, Teach For America Chicago, The Network for Teaching Entrepreneurship Chicago, and KIPP: Chicago. Quazzo received the 2014 Arnold M. Berlin '46 Distinguished Service to Princeton Award from the Princeton University Club of Chicago, the 2014 Visionary of the Year Award from CFY PowerMyLearning, the 2016 LEAP Innovator in Education "Champion" Award from LEAP Innovations, the 2016 Inaugural Impact Award from Golden Apple Foundation, and the 2017 Visionary Award from the Association of American Publishers (AAP).

Deborah is the chair of BrightCHAMPS Global Curriculum Advisory Board. BrightCHAMPS is an India-based edtech startup that operates in 30+ countries, including India, Indonesia, United Arab Emirates, Saudi Arabia, United Kingdom, the United States of America, Vietnam, Singapore, Malaysia, Thailand, Pakistan, Sri Lanka, Philippines, South Africa, Egypt, Kuwait, Bahrain, Oman, Nigeria, Lebanon, Australia, among others.

References

Living people
American venture capitalists
Harvard Business School alumni
Princeton University alumni
Year of birth missing (living people)
Members of the Chicago Board of Education